The Indian grey mongoose (Urva edwardsii) is a mongoose species native to the Indian subcontinent and West Asia. It is listed as Least Concern on the IUCN Red List. 

The grey mongoose inhabits open forests, scrublands and cultivated fields, often close to human habitation. It lives in burrows, hedgerows and thickets, among groves of trees, and takes shelter under rocks or bushes and even in drains. It is bold and inquisitive but wary, seldom venturing far from cover. It is an excellent climber and usually lives singly or in pairs. Its prey includes rodents, snakes, birds’ eggs and hatchlings, lizards and a variety of invertebrates. Along the Chambal River it occasionally feeds on gharial eggs. It breeds throughout the year.

Characteristics
The Indian grey mongoose has tawny grey or iron grey fur, which is more grizzled and stiffer and coarser than that of other mongooses. The ruddiness of the coat varies in different subspecies, but it is described as appearing more grey than other mongooses. The grizzled appearance comes from the individual hairs being ringed by creamy-white and black. The legs are brown and darker than the body. The hair around the muzzle and eyes is also brown but with a stronger rusty red colouring. The tail is bushy, whilst the tip of the tail, if coloured, is pale yellow or white.

Their tail length equals their body length. Body length: 36–45 cm (14-17 inches) Tail length: 45 cm (17 inches), weight: 0.9-1.7 kg (2-4 lb). Males are significantly larger than the females. Indian grey mongooses are unusual in that they can discriminate four colours, more than most other mammals.

Distribution and habitat 
It has been generally accepted that the Indian grey mongoose occurs in Saudi Arabia, Kuwait, Bahrain, Iran, Afghanistan, Pakistan, India, Nepal, Sri Lanka, and Bangladesh, as represented by the distribution map. A 2007 study found specimens also in Turkey, and United Arab Emirates, thus extending the known range.

Despite being a common animal, the natural history of the Indian grey mongoose is not well known. They appear to be able to occupy a wide variety of habitats but preferring open types. These include grasslands, open areas, rocky patches, scrub, semi-desert, cultivated fields and other disturbed areas, areas of thickets, bushy vegetation, dry secondary forest, thorn forest, forest edges, and also near human settlement. Although the creature has been described as being less dependent on human settlements, observations in India in heavily forested areas show it to be much more common around human settlements often scavenging on waste.

Taxonomy
Ichneumon edwardsii was the scientific name proposed by Étienne Geoffroy Saint-Hilaire in 1817. It was later classified in the genus Herpestes, but all Asian mongooses are now classified in the genus Urva.

Subspecies:
 U. e. edwardsii
 U. e. ferrugineus
 U. e. lanka
 U. e. montanus
 U. e. nyula

Ecology and behaviour
The Indian grey mongoose is omnivorous, though most of its diet is made up from live prey it catches from being an opportunistic hunter, with mice, rats, lizards, snakes, and beetles making up the bulk. Also eaten are ground birds, their eggs, grasshoppers, scorpions, centipedes, frogs, crabs, fish, and parts of plants: fruits, berries, and roots, as well as larger prey including hares and egrets. It kills prey by delivering a bite to the neck or head.

This species is known for its ability to combat venomous snakes. It primarily achieves this through tiring the snake out, by enticing it to make multiple strikes which it acrobatically avoids. Secondary protection against the venomous bite includes the stiff rigid hair, which is excited at such times, the thick loose skin and specialised acetylcholine receptors render it resistant or immune to snake venom.
When dealing with scorpions, no measures are taken to disable the sting, and they are picked up in any manner.

The Indian grey mongoose typically opens eggs by holding them between the paws and biting a hole in the little end. Smaller mongooses typically open eggs by throwing them between their legs against a hard object, so it has been speculated, that the adult Indian grey mongoose should do likewise with large eggs.

The Indian grey mongoose mates between March and October, it breeding two to three times each year. The gestation period lasts for 60 to 65 days, the female gives birth to two to four offspring.

The lifespan of the Indian grey mongoose is seven years in the wild, or 12 years, when in captivity.

Relation with humans
The Indian grey mongoose is often kept as a pet to keep dwellings free from rats and other pests.

The Indian grey mongoose is the state animal of Chandigarh.

The species is protected in India, but an illegal trade in hair for the purposes of making of paint brushes and shaving brushes continues, and this is one of its most significant threats. About 3000 mongoose were killed to produce 155 kg. of raw mongoose hair, which were seized by Uttar Pradesh Forest Department and Wildlife Crime Control Bureau (WCCB) in 2018.

Etymology
 in Telugu;

In popular culture 
"Rikki-Tikki-Tavi" is a short story by Rudyard Kipling about the adventures of a valiant young Indian grey mongoose.

References 

Urva (genus)
Mammals of India
Mammals of Nepal
Mammals of Bhutan
Mammals of Sri Lanka
Mammals described in 1818
Taxobox binomials not recognized by IUCN